The women's long jump event at the 1970 British Commonwealth Games was held on 25 July at the Meadowbank Stadium in Edinburgh, Scotland.

Results

References

Results
Australian results

Athletics at the 1970 British Commonwealth Games
1970